Kochi Tuskers Kerala (KTK) played fourteen matches in the 2011 Indian Premier League, with 20 players representing it in these matches. KTK was a franchise cricket team based in Kochi, Kerala, which was a part of the 2011 season of the Indian Premier League (IPL). The IPL is a professional league for Twenty20 (T20) cricket in India. The team was one of two new franchises added to the IPL, alongside the Pune Warriors India; however it was terminated by the Board of Control for Cricket in India (BCCI) for "breaching its terms of agreement". It was owned by Kochi Cricket Pvt Ltd., captained by Mahela Jayawardene, and coached by Geoff Lawson. Their first match was against Royal Challengers Bangalore, whereas their first win was against Mumbai Indians.

In total, KTK played fourteen IPL matches. Four KTK players took part in all fourteen matches: Brad Hodge, Parthiv Patel, Ravindra Jadeja, and R. P. Singh. Brendon McCullum, who has played in thirteen matches out of the team's 14 IPL fixtures, was the leading run-scorer with 357 runs. His score of 81, made against Mumbai Indians, was the highest total by an KTK batsman. Brad Hodge had the highest batting average, whereas Mahela Jayawardene scored the most number of half-centuries for KTK with three. RP Singh claimed more wickets than any other KTK player, having taken 13. The best bowling average was Brad Hodge's 11.00, though among bowlers who have bowled more than 20 overs, RP Singh had the best average: 26.53. Brad Hodge also has the best bowling figures in an innings; he claimed four wickets against Rajasthan Royals, while only conceding thirteen runs. Parthiv Patel tookn eight catches and has taken one stump as wicket-keeper for KTK. Mahela Jayawardene and RP Singh has claimed the highest number of catches among fielders, both taking six.

This list includes all players who have played at least one match for KTK and is listed alphabetically by their first name.

Key

Players

References

Kochi Tuskers Kerala
Kochi Tuskers Kerala cricketers